The Men's 4 x 100 metre medley relay event at the 2014 Asian Games took place on 26 September 2014 at Munhak Park Tae-hwan Aquatics Center.

Schedule
All times are Korea Standard Time (UTC+09:00)

Records

Results
Legend
DNS — Did not start

Heats

Final

 South Korea originally won the bronze medal, but was later disqualified after Park Tae-hwan tested positive for Nebido.

References

Heats Results
Final Results

External links
Official website

Swimming at the 2014 Asian Games